The Battle of Baghdad International Airport was a battle fought primarily between US Army  truck drivers, Air Defense Artillery, Armor, Military Police, Engineers and miscellaneous logistics personnel and al Sadr's Mahdi Army on Easter Sunday, April 11, 2004, along the Southwest side of the Baghdad International Airport wall commonly referred to as Engineer Village. That section of Baghdad International Airport was home to numerous Engineer units, in particular the 389th Combat Engineers, a chow hall, and a convoy marshaling area.

History
On April 5, 2004, the radical young cleric Muqtada al Sadr called for a jihad against coalition forces and wanted to gain control of Al Kut, An Najaf and Sadr City. This led to widespread fighting throughout the Sunni Triangle. His militia was outmatched by the M1 Abrams tanks of the 1st Cavalry Division, however they knew that the Abrams tanks were dependent on resupply trucks. On Thursday night, April 8, the militia destroyed eight bridges and overpasses around Convoy Support Center Scania thus halting all northbound traffic into the Sunni Triangle.

The coalition forces were forced to survive on the few days of supply they had on hand in Iraq. That same evening, 2LT James L. McCormick's Humvee gun truck, Zebra, of the 1486th Transportation Company, fought off an enemy ambush at the turn into BIAP for about 20 minutes with him and SPC Brandon Lawson was seriously wounded. After medical treatment, both returned to their convoy. The next day, Good Friday and the anniversary of the fall of Baghdad, the Iraqis ambushed every convoy that tried to enter or leave Baghdad International Airport including the ambush of the 724th Transportation Company. The next day all roads were coded black meaning that any convoy expected imminent attack. With no more convoys venturing out, the militia decided to attack the trucks where they parked.

By Easter Sunday, April 11, several hundred trucks parked behind the southwest wall of BIAP defended by the C Battery, 4-5 Air Defense Artillery.  By then the 1st Cavalry Division was 48 hours from mission failure and required emergency resupply of fuel and ammunition. A fuel convoy of the 706th Transportation Company ventured out of BIAP and was ambushed. Around lunch the Madhi Militia launched an attack near the south gate at BIAP. The attack began with suppressive fire on the guard tower closest to the gate while three sappers approached the wall just as the Zebra happened to be passing by. 2LT McCormick ordered his driver, CPL Bryan Noble, to drive on the ramp in time to engage the three sappers.

The five crew members then held off the rest of the Iraqi militants at the irrigation ditch 50 meters away for the next five to ten minutes while about a dozen more truck drivers came running to their assistance. For approximately 45 minutes, the enemy concentrated their attack on the section of wall occupied by the Zebra, and a handful of truck drivers fought back against intense small arms fire and repeated volleys of rocket propelled grenades. The M6 Linebacker outside the gate to their left and truck drivers crowded around a Humvee on the dirt ramp a hundred meters to their right provided flanking fire. Military police Soldiers of the 501st Military Police Company 1st Armored Division joined the truck drivers on the other ramp. Intermittent breaks in .50 Caliber M2HB fire mounted on a Humvee on the ramp to the right were halted to allow SGT Bryant, a 1AD 501st MP Sergeant, to fire three consecutive AT-4 rounds into the enemy location. Later four Humvees of F Battery, 202nd Air Defense Artillery returned to the gate and added their flanking fire to the fight. Late in the battle, a HET convoy hauling tanks from the 1st Armored Division arrived at the gate and a colonel climbed up in the guard tower.

He instructed McCormick to back the Zebra off the ramp and bring up SGT Christopher M. Lehman's Humvee gun truck with a Mk 19 grenade launcher because McCormick's M2 Browning .50 caliber machinegun could not hit the enemy mortar position. Finally, CPT Peter Glass’ C Troop, 3-8 Cavalry arrived and replaced the gun trucks on the ramps with his M-1 Abrams tanks which ended the enemy resistance after 45 minutes of fighting.

Aftermath
Thirty minutes after having defeated the enemy attack, the crew of the Zebra fought through three more ambushes to escort convoys with critical ammunition to the Green Zone for the 1st Cavalry Division. All but one of the five crew members was wounded that weekend, but all remained with their gun truck. With other emergency convoys of fuel and ammunition, the 1st Cavalry Division was able to beat back the al Sadr April Uprising.

Twelve Bronze Star Medals and four Army Commendation Medals were awarded to truck drivers for this battle. McCormick was finally awarded the Silver Star Medal in 2014 for his role in this battle and the three convoy ambushes immediately after it. The battle ranks as one of the great feats of heroism of the US Army Transportation Corps.

References

Further reading
 
 
Convoy Ambush Case Studies Vol. II, Iraq and Afghanistan Richard E. Killblane, US Army Transportation School, 2015

External links

Video: Attack at BIAP, https://www.youtube.com/watch?v=noi12Ji8nu8

Video: BIAP Warrior Ethos, https://web.archive.org/web/20141206193701/http://www.yourepeat.com/watch/?v=N-4RQAzIPF0

Video: BIAP 2004 Easter, https://web.archive.org/web/20141201220836/http://www.yourepeat.com/watch/?v=uHiZUSNLpUo

BIAP 2004
BIAP 2004
2000s in Baghdad
BIAP 2004
2004 in Iraq
April 2004 events in Iraq